Nicolas Abu Samah (1939 – April 8, 2016) was a Lebanese director, actor, and producer. He introduced dubbing into the Arab world. He was appointed to the  Lebanon Television Council, resigning in 2013.

Television
He studied at the Higher Institute of Cinema in Paris, France, where he spent six years. He worked and gained experience on French television. He returned to Lebanon and began work with Levant TV. His directorial debut was a program Yvette Sarsaq.  He directed Guare Ataiwha and Wondrous Strange and other soap operas. He has directed more than 2,000 hours of serials and programs. His last work, Romeo Lahoud, was in 1973.

Dubbing
He established his company FILMALI in the late 70's the first dubbing company in the Middle East, which dubbed films into Arabic, such as Sinbad and Treasure Island and Accessories and The Smurfs. He and his wife owned the channel "Anttenne Plus" in Lebanon. Filmali provided dubbing for Mexican soap operas including You or No One, Regardless of the Price, Maria Lina, The Last Hostage and other foreign serials.

Death 
He died on April 8, 2016 at age 77 years.

References

1939 births
2016 deaths
Lebanese male television actors
Voice directors
Lebanese male voice actors